Carolus Rex is the sixth studio album by Swedish power metal band Sabaton. It is a concept album based on the rise and fall of the Swedish Empire, whose monarch Charles XII gives it its title. It was released with both English and Swedish vocals. It is the last album to feature guitarists Oskar Montelius and Rikard Sundén, drummer Daniel Mullback and keyboardist Daniel Mÿhr. It was produced by Peter Tägtgren in Abyss Studios. The album received critical acclaim and commercial success, achieving gold certification in Poland and quadruple platinum in Sweden.

In 2015, four Carolus Rex songs were featured in the Sabaton Soundtrack DLC for the historical grand strategy game Europa Universalis 4 by Paradox Interactive. The four included with the DLC were "The Lion from the North", "A Lifetime of War", "The Carolean's Prayer", and "Carolus Rex". Another song ("The Art of War") from Sabaton's The Art of War album was also included.

Reception 
As of 18 September 2012, the album is certified gold in Sweden, selling over 30,000 copies (20,000 copies sold is needed for an album to be certified gold in Sweden). As of March 2013, the album is also certified gold in Poland. On 18 June 2013, Carolus Rex was certified platinum in Sweden with 40,000 album sales, making it the "most successful Swedish heavy metal album ever" according to the band. 

On 28 September 2018, Sabaton announced that the album had been awarded quadruple platinum status after remaining on the Swedish chart for 326 weeks, and commemorated this with a number of limited edition versions and merchandise. These were set for release on 30 November 2018, the 300th anniversary of the death of Charles XII.

In 2019, Metal Hammer ranked it as the 20th best power metal album of all time.

Track listing

A Swedish edition of the album, with Swedish lyrics, is also available.

The limited 2-CD mail order edition of the album includes the English version with all of the bonus tracks and the Swedish version, as well as alternate artwork.

Covers
 Fellow Falun-based metal band Follow the Cipher, which includes Carolus Rex contributing songwriter Ken Kängström, covered "Carolus Rex" on their 2018 self-titled debut album. Metal Injection's review of the album noted Linda Toni Grahn's version of the vocals sounded "more haunting".
 German metal band Feuerschwanz released a cover of "Gott mit uns" for their 2020 studio album "Das Elfte Gebot".

Personnel

Band members 
 Joakim Brodén – lead vocals
 Pär Sundström – bass
 Oskar Montelius – guitars, backing vocals
 Rikard Sundén – guitars, backing vocals
 Daniel Mÿhr – keyboards, backing vocals
 Daniel Mullback – drums

Guest musicians 
 Peter Tägtgren – vocals on "Gott mit uns" and "Twilight of the Thunder God", guitar solo on "Twilight of the Thunder God"

Certifications

References 

2012 albums
Sabaton (band) albums
Nuclear Blast albums
Albums produced by Peter Tägtgren
Concept albums
Cultural depictions of Gustavus Adolphus of Sweden
Cultural depictions of Charles XII of Sweden
Swedish nationalism